Oregon Route 99W is a state-numbered route in Oregon, United States, that runs from OR 99 and OR 99E in Junction City north to I-5 in southwestern Portland.  Some signage continues it north to US 26 near downtown, but most signage agrees with the Oregon Department of Transportation's (ODOT) description, ending it at I-5. OR 99W is known by ODOT as the Pacific Highway West No. 1W (see Oregon highways and routes); that highway continues north through downtown (along a former extension of OR 99W) to the Pacific Highway No. 1 (I-5) in northern Portland, as well as south on OR 99 to the Pacific Highway (I-5) in Eugene.

Until around 1972, OR 99W was U.S. Route 99W, rejoining OR 99E (formerly US 99E) in northern Portland. US 99 then continued north along present I-5 into Washington; the next segment still numbered 99 is WA 99 south of Seattle.

Route description
The Pacific Highway West begins at the interchange with I-5 (Pacific Highway) and OR 126 Business (McKenzie Highway No. 15) in eastern Eugene. It heads west through downtown Eugene along OR 99 and OR 126 Business, and then northwest and north to Junction City on OR 99.

At Junction City, OR 99 ends and OR 99W begins along the Pacific Highway West, while OR 99E heads northeast on the Albany-Junction City Highway No. 58. While OR 99E quickly crosses the Willamette River, OR 99W stays on its west side through the Willamette Valley, passing through towns such as Monroe, Corvallis, Monmouth, Rickreall, Amity, McMinnville and Lafayette. Oregon Route 18 provides a bypass for OR 99W around downtown McMinnville and Lafayette.

At McMinnville, OR 99W turns northeast. It passes through the winemaking towns of Dundee and Newberg before entering the Portland suburb of Sherwood. OR 18 provides a partial bypass for OR 99W around downtown Dundee and Newberg. The bypass currently ends at OR 219, but is proposed to extend northeast to OR 99W northeast of Newberg. OR 99W then skirts the city of Tualatin and passes through Tigard before entering Portland and immediately ending at I-5.

The Pacific Highway West, however, continues northeast and north, paralleling I-5 on Barbur Boulevard. OR 10 joins at Capitol Highway, which is not a state highway. South of the Ross Island Bridge approach, Oregon Highway 99W and OR 10 split from Barbur Boulevard onto Naito Parkway, an arterial that once connected directly to Harbor Drive. OR 10 ends at the west end of the Ross Island Bridge, which carries US 26, the Mt. Hood Highway No. 26. Until around 2005, US 26 came off the bridge onto the Pacific Highway West north into downtown Portland, but it now heads west on the locally maintained Arthur Street to reach I-405.

At the overpass over I-405 is the former split with Harbor Drive, which was replaced by Tom McCall Waterfront Park in 1974. The road now runs into Naito Parkway (formerly Front Avenue), and is state-maintained until Market Street, the eastbound half of the one-way pair of the Sunset Highway (US 26 left the Pacific Highway West here prior to ca. 2005).

The Pacific Highway West continues north through downtown, locally maintained along Naito Parkway, to the state-maintained Steel Bridge. There is a direct ramp for northbound traffic onto the bridge, but the former southbound ramp is now used by the MAX Light Rail system, and so southbound traffic must head west to 3rd Avenue, three blocks west of Naito Parkway.

At the northeast end of the Steel Bridge, the Pacific Highway West again becomes locally maintained, and heads north on Interstate Avenue all the way to I-5 (the Pacific Highway) near the Interstate Bridge. It is again state-maintained north of Argyle Street.

History

The first highway in the corridor was the Capitol Highway (Highway 3), from Portland to Salem via Dayton (roughly present OR 99W and OR 221). In 1927 it was merged with the West Side Highway, which ran from Dayton to Junction City, to form the West Side Pacific Highway, still numbered 3, and a western loop of the Pacific Highway (Highway 1/U.S. Route 99). (The former Capitol Highway south of Dayton was removed from the system, but was later taken over as the Salem-Dayton Highway.)

In 1930, Highway 3 was assigned the U.S. Route 99W number, and Highway 1 (old US 99) between the ends of Highway 3 became US 99E. Highway 1 was similarly split in 1938, forming the Pacific Highway West - Highway 1W - and the Pacific Highway East, Highway 1E. Highway 1W was formed from Highway 3, and extended north on Interstate Avenue to just south of the Interstate Bridge.

In 1957, with the assignment of I-5, the Pacific Highway (Highway 1) was moved to its planned alignment, resulting in an extension of Highway 1W south to Eugene. US 99W however continued to terminate at Junction City; the new I-5 was designated US 99 when it opened in 1961. (US 99W from south of downtown Portland north to its end was temporarily part of US 99 from 1961 to 1963, when I-5 opened north of downtown.)

US 99 became OR 99 in 1972, resulting in the renumbering of US 99W to OR 99W. It was truncated in 1979 to I-5 just north of the Tigard/Portland line. It was again re-extended to south of downtown in 1996, with various signs identifying it as 99W placed sporadically between downtown and Tigard.

Old alignments
The original alignment in southern Portland, bypassed in the 1930s by Barbur Boulevard, is still called Capitol Highway. It begins at the present north end of OR 99W and runs first east, then west, of Highway 1W, eventually merging with OR 10 (formerly the Beaverton-Hillsdale Highway) before ending at Highway 1W south of downtown.

Through downtown Portland, the original alignment took US 99W across the Broadway Bridge, reaching it via 4th Avenue, Burnside Street, and Broadway northbound, and Broadway, Pine Street, and 6th Avenue southbound. In 1950 it was realigned along Harbor Drive, the Steel Bridge and a realigned Interstate Avenue. Harbor Drive was removed in 1974, resulting in OR 99W moving west one block to Front Street (now Naito Parkway) downtown.

Major intersections
Note: mileposts do not reflect actual mileage due to realignments.

References

External links

Oregon Highways - Pacific Highway West #1W

099W
U.S. Route 99
Transportation in Washington County, Oregon
Transportation in Yamhill County, Oregon
Transportation in Lane County, Oregon
Transportation in Multnomah County, Oregon
Monmouth, Oregon
Tigard, Oregon
Transportation in Polk County, Oregon
Transportation in Benton County, Oregon
1972 establishments in Oregon